From November 1947 the roads to the four kibbutzim of Gush Etzion ("The Etzion Bloc"), south of Jerusalem were blockaded by militias from neighbouring villages. The Haganah used a strategy of armed convoys to get supplies to the outposts. The initial convoys to the bloc used open pickup trucks ("tenders"), since the British claimed that armored vehicles would irritate the Arabs. The convoys were accompanied by official Mandate police "monitors" (notrim) in uniform.

11 December 1947
The "Convoy of Ten" was the first failed attempt using this method. Its four vehicles were ambushed on the main road north of King Solomon's pools on December 11, 1947. Ten of the convoy personnel were killed, four injured and only four escaped unhurt. On December 14 an additional person was killed in another attack on a convoy. The Haganah then decided that henceforth it would use armored "sandwich" vehicles in the convoys.

16 January 1948

The "Convoy of 35": As an alternative to the Jerusalem road the Palmach attempted to reach the settlements from the west. Thirty-five members of the platoon were massacred when they were attacked by militiamen from Surif.

27 March 1948
The "Nabi Daniel Convoy" refers to a large group ambushed on their way back to Jerusalem on 27 March 1948. The Scotsman newspaper's correspondent Eric Downton described the incident:

References

1948 Arab–Israeli War
Convoy
Haganah
Battles and operations of the 1948 Arab–Israeli War